Block Island Wind Farm is the first commercial offshore wind farm in the United States, located  from Block Island, Rhode Island in the Atlantic Ocean. The five-turbine, 30 MW project was developed by Deepwater Wind, now Ørsted US Offshore Wind.

Construction began in 2015 and in late summer 2016 five Alstom Haliade 150-6MW turbines were erected. Operations were launched in December 2016. It is the largest project using wind power in Rhode Island.

Design and capacity

The project is expected to produce more than 125,000 megawatt hours of electricity annually. Power is transmitted from the turbines to the electric grid along a  transmission submarine power cable buried under the ocean floor, making landfall north of Scarborough Beach in Narragansett, Rhode Island. The structures were designed by Alstom Wind, standing . They can withstand a Category 3 storm. The system connects New Shoreham, Rhode Island to the grid for the first time and allows it to cease using diesel generators. Gulf Island Fabrication was interested in building the foundations.

Permits and funding
The Block Island Wind Farm was conceived as a larger project extending into neighboring Massachusetts to build a $1.5-billion, 385-megawatt wind farm in federal waters. The 100-turbine project could provide 1.3 terawatt-hours (TW·h) of electricity per year – 15 percent of all electricity used in the state. In 2009, the State of Rhode Island designated Deepwater Wind to begin with pilot projects. In that year Deepwater signed an agreement with National Grid to sell the power from the wind farm off Block Island, at an initial price of 24.4¢/kW·h, with a guaranteed 3.5% annual increase.

The permitting process for the project has been highly controversial, with the Rhode Island Public Utilities Commission (RIPUC) initially rejecting the agreement price with National Grid as being excessive to Rhode Island's electricity rate payers.  However, after the Rhode Island General Assembly and Governor Carcieri changed the state law concerning the "commercial reasonability" of contract pricing, the RIPUC voted to approve the key contract.  After continuing controversy and appeals, the Rhode Island Supreme Court ruled in July 2011 to uphold the RIPUC decision.  Opponents of the project raised issue about the contract pricing with the United States Federal Energy Regulatory Commission (FERC) in August 2012, but FERC in October of the same year issued a decision that they would not act on the complaint. A total of nine reviews and permits from state federal agencies were acquired, the last in early May 2015.  On May 11, 2015 a new complaint was filed with FERC alleging that the power purchase agreement with National Grid violates the  Public Utilities Regulatory Policy Act of 1978 and further alleging that the RIPUC violated the Federal Power Act and the Supremacy Clause of the U.S. Constitution.  However, Deepwater Wind maintains that there is no support for any of these claims and that FERC should promptly deny the new complaint in its entirety.

While the wind turbines have been built in state waters southeast of Block Island, the transmission cable crosses federal waters in the Atlantic.

Deepwater Wind announced March 2015 that it had received funding in the amount of $290 million from mandated lead arrangers Société Générale of Paris, France and KeyBank National Association of Cleveland, Ohio.

The farm design was verified in 2017.

Construction
In late 2014, Gulf Island Fabrication, Inc. began steel work construction at its Houma, Louisiana shipyard. The building phase would focus on the turbines' foundations (for platforms) to be pile-anchored to the ocean floor. On June 26, 2015, the first of the five foundations for the project began its move via barge from Louisiana. The turbines will be delivered later in 2015 and erected in place in 2016. Foundation assembly started in ProvPort in March 2016, with estimated commissioning in late 2016. GZA GeoEnvironmental provided the geotechnical design and consulting for the staging facility at the Port of Providence.

The structures, designed by Alstom Wind, stand 600 ft (180 m) high and can withstand a Category 3 storm.[6][7][8] The foundations were designed by Louisiana-based Keystone Engineering Inc. to withstand a 1000-year storm. The foundations’ robust strength is the product of meticulous design processes and thorough engineering analysis performed by Keystone. While the four-pile jacket foundation is common for offshore oil and gas platforms, Block Island's jackets are engineered to handle additional loading and vibration from the spinning turbines  Keystone's engineering team ran thousands of test simulations, repeating each calculation multiple times to ensure the design would hold up under various weather conditions and load scenarios. Altogether, nearly 10 million tests were completed.

On March 9, 2015, French company Alstom received  final notication to begin fabrication of five Alstom Haliade 150 6 MW offshore wind turbines. GE Wind Energy acquired Alstom Wind and Haliade production in November 2015. As of July 2016, the site was grid-connected, and towers and LM Wind Power blades were in the port of Providence. The Norwegian installation jack-up vessel was on its way to France to pick up the 400 tonne generators, as it was not able to pick them up from an easier US port due to the Jones Act. A test version of the direct-drive turbine is installed at Østerild Wind Turbine Test Field.

The first turbine was erected in August 2016. On August 18, 2016, Deepwater Wind CEO Jeffrey Grybowski announced Block Island Wind Farm was fully constructed. The wind farm commenced commercial operation in December 2016.

Operation

The project also provided jobs for the state of Rhode Island, employing welders, workers during assembly of the wind turbines, and divers.

See also
Coastal Virginia Offshore Wind
List of offshore wind farms in the United States
Ocean Wind

References

External links
Block Island Wind Farm Website 

Wind power in Rhode Island
Offshore wind farms in the United States
New Shoreham, Rhode Island
2016 establishments in Rhode Island
Energy infrastructure completed in 2016